Terry Murphy may refer to:

 Terry Murphy (broadcaster) (born 1948), American television host and correspondent
 Terry Murphy (snooker player) (born 1972), Northern Irish snooker player
 Terry Murphy (American politician), Republican member of Montana Legislature
 Terry Murphy (footballer) (born 1940), English footballer
 Terry Murphy (rugby league) (born 1952), Australian former rugby league footballer
 Terrence Murphy (Canadian politician) (1926–2008), known as Terry, Canadian lawyer, politician and judge

See also
 Terrence Murphy (disambiguation)